Varakkal Devi Temple is a Devi temple in Kozhikode district of Kerala.

The temple is located near the Bhat Road beach at a distance of 6 Kms from Kozhikode railway station, very close to NH17 towards Mangalore. It is 27 kilometers from Calicut International Airport.

Varakkal Sri Durga Devi Temple offerings 
 Mahanivedyam the most important ritual
 Pushpanjali
 Padivilakku
 Naivilakku
 Thrikalapooja
 Swayamvara Pushpanjali
 Santhana Gopala Pooja
 Ganapathy Homam
 Thilaka Homam

Management

The temple is administered by Zamorin of Calicut.

See also
 List of Hindu temples in Kerala
 Sabarimala
 Tali Shiva Temple
 Valayanad Devi Temple
 Azhakodi Devi Temple

References

External links 
 https://www.keralatourism.org/destination/varakkal-devi-temple/521
 http://www.webindia123.com/city/kerala/kozhikode/destinations/temples/varakkaldevitemple.htm
 http://www.thehindu.com/todays-paper/tp-national/tp-kerala/kumbha-vavu-bali-offered/article5745030.ece

Devi temples in Kerala
Hindu temples in Kozhikode district